Turkmenbashi railway station is the main railway station in Turkmenbashi, Turkmenistan. It was built in 1895. The station is operated by the state owned company Türkmendemirýollary.

History 

Station Turkmenbashi in the Moorish style was built in the years 1895–96. Architect - Alexeï Léontiévitch Benois, who has worked in Krasnovodsk. The station building - one of the most beautiful in the whole of Central Asia rail. The architecture of the station, there are many elements of the palace of the Emir of Bukhara. Railway Station Square is located near to a memorial to Turkmen soldiers killed in the Second World War (1941 - 1945).

Service 
There are train route 606/605 Ashgabat - Turkmenbashi - Ashgabat.

See also 
 Railway stations in Turkmenistan

References

Railway stations in Turkmenistan
Railway stations opened in 1885